"Somebody Someone" is a promotional single by American nu metal band Korn from their fourth album Issues.

It was the least successful single from the album, and failed to reach the top 20 of Billboard'''s Mainstream Rock and Modern Rock charts, although it gained moderate airplay on MTV's Total Request Live''.

The song is well known for its live performance and has become a concert staple from 2000-2011. It was absent from The Path of Totality Tour setlist, a first since its release. However, the end section of the song was played directly the performance of "Shoots and Ladders" at live performances starting in 2013.

Music video 
The music video, directed by Martin Weisz, is performance-based and filled with CGI effects, with a similar look as its predecessor, "Make Me Bad" (also directed by Weisz).

Remixes

References

Korn songs
1999 songs
Song recordings produced by Brendan O'Brien (record producer)
2000 singles
Songs written by Reginald Arvizu
Songs written by Jonathan Davis
Songs written by James Shaffer
Songs written by David Silveria
Songs written by Brian Welch
Music videos directed by Martin Weisz